Pheidole phanigaster is a species of ant in the genus Pheidole. It was discovered and described by J.T. Longino in 2009.

References

phanigaster
Insects described in 2009